Scott Lucas (born 30 December 1977) is a former Australian rules footballer for the Essendon Football Club in the Australian Football League, and is noted as the other major forward for the Bombers along with Matthew Lloyd. Together, Lloyd and Lucas were affectionately dubbed the "twin towers" due to their height in the Bomber forward line.

Football career 
Lucas is known for his strong marking and being a powerful, accurate left-foot kick, although his apparent inability to kick with his right foot is almost as notable. Lucas once joked on The Sunday Footy Show in 2006 that the last time he kicked with his right foot was to Gary Moorcroft when he took the 2001 Mark of the Year.

He mainly played across half-forward or centre half-forward, but also played at centre half-back and full-forward. Lucas regularly had shots on goal from outside 60 metres with his booming left foot, and he rarely handballed, averaging less than 3 handballs a match.

In Round 19, 2005, Lucas played his 200th AFL game and kicked his 300th AFL goal against  at Telstra Dome, but the milestones would be remembered for all the wrong reasons, as the Bombers lost by 20 points despite leading at every change.

In 2006, Lucas had an outstanding year in an underachieving Essendon side, playing at full-forward and being their main target and goalkicker in the absence of captain Matthew Lloyd. Lucas finished the season with a career-best 67 goals, runner-up in the Coleman Medal behind Brendan Fevola, and polled a joint team-high seven votes from just 36 votes received by Essendon players in the 2006 Brownlow Medal. Lucas was one of just three players who played every match for season 2006. He capped off this season with his second Crichton Medal, winning with 239 votes from Jobe Watson's 221. Lucas had previously won the club trophy in 2003, when the honours were shared with club great James Hird.

Against West Coast in Round 11, 2007, Lucas booted his 400th career goal.

A vintage display also came against West Coast in Round 22, when, despite being close to 50 points down, Lucas rallied in the last quarter in a remarkable solo effort, booting 7 goals (and just missing for a record-equalling eighth), reducing the margin to just 2 points. In the end, though, a late goal to the Eagles saw a gallant Essendon fall 8 points short of one of the greatest-ever AFL comebacks. This was also the last game of Essendon legend James Hird and coach of 27 years, Kevin Sheedy.

During a match against the Western Bulldogs in the 2008 NAB Cup, Lucas managed to kick a record 3 Super Goals, which took his career tally to 7, making him the leading super-goal-kicker in the AFL.

Lucas suffered a knee injury (specifically, a torn cartilage) in the first round of the 2008 season against North Melbourne and was out of action for a number of weeks. Along with teammate Dustin Fletcher, Lucas signed a one-year contract in mid-2008. He bounced back to play in the second half of the season and kicked an amazing midair soccer goal against Richmond late in the season.

On 18 August 2009, Lucas announced his immediate retirement from football.

In 2013, Lucas was inducted into the Essendon Football Club Hall of Fame.

Playing statistics

|- style="background-color: #EAEAEA"
! scope="row" style="text-align:center" | 1996
|style="text-align:center;"|
| 25 || 14 || 11 || 11 || 84 || 49 || 133 || 44 || 19 || 0.8 || 0.8 || 6.0 || 3.5 || 9.5 || 3.1 || 1.4
|-
! scope="row" style="text-align:center" | 1997
|style="text-align:center;"|
| 25 || 22 || 23 || 11 || 241 || 85 || 326 || 123 || 24 || 1.0 || 0.5 || 11.0 || 3.9 || 14.8 || 5.6 || 1.1
|- style="background:#eaeaea;"
! scope="row" style="text-align:center" | 1998
|style="text-align:center;"|
| 25 || 23 || 49 || 31 || 287 || 51 || 338 || 123 || 30 || 2.1 || 1.3 || 12.5 || 2.2 || 14.7 || 5.3 || 1.3
|-
! scope="row" style="text-align:center" | 1999
|style="text-align:center;"|
| 25 || 10 || 8 || 9 || 106 || 27 || 133 || 45 || 12 || 0.8 || 0.9 || 10.6 || 2.7 || 13.3 || 4.5 || 1.2
|- style="background:#eaeaea;"
! scope="row" style="text-align:center" | 2000
|style="text-align:center;"|
| 25 || 23 || 57 || 42 || 265 || 84 || 349 || 132 || 38 || 2.5 || 1.8 || 11.5 || 3.7 || 15.2 || 5.7 || 1.7
|-
! scope="row" style="text-align:center" | 2001
|style="text-align:center;"|
| 25 || 25 || 35 || 34 || 297 || 76 || 373 || 135 || 42 || 1.4 || 1.4 || 11.9 || 3.0 || 14.9 || 5.4 || 1.7
|- style="background:#eaeaea;"
! scope="row" style="text-align:center" | 2002
|style="text-align:center;"|
| 25 || 19 || 25 || 15 || 235 || 60 || 295 || 108 || 33 || 1.3 || 0.8 || 12.4 || 3.2 || 15.5 || 5.7 || 1.7
|-
! scope="row" style="text-align:center" | 2003
|style="text-align:center;"|
| 25 || 24 || 19 || 16 || 334 || 83 || 417 || 130 || 61 || 0.8 || 0.7 || 13.9 || 3.5 || 17.4 || 5.4 || 2.5
|- style="background:#eaeaea;"
! scope="row" style="text-align:center" | 2004
|style="text-align:center;"|
| 25 || 21 || 25 || 21 || 275 || 69 || 344 || 108 || 53 || 1.2 || 1.0 || 13.1 || 3.3 || 16.4 || 5.1 || 2.5
|-
! scope="row" style="text-align:center" | 2005
|style="text-align:center;"|
| 25 || 22 || 51 || 24 || 289 || 48 || 337 || 134 || 49 || 2.3 || 1.1 || 13.1 || 2.2 || 15.3 || 6.1 || 2.2
|- style="background:#eaeaea;"
! scope="row" style="text-align:center" | 2006
|style="text-align:center;"|
| 25 || 22 || 67 || 44 || 310 || 58 || 368 || 183 || 33 || 3.0 || 2.0 || 14.1 || 2.6 || 16.7 || 8.3 || 1.5
|-
! scope="row" style="text-align:center" | 2007
|style="text-align:center;"|
| 25 || 22 || 61 || 28 || 292 || 66 || 358 || 159 || 31 || 2.8 || 1.3 || 13.3 || 3.0 || 16.3 || 7.2 || 1.4
|- style="background:#eaeaea;"
! scope="row" style="text-align:center" | 2008
|style="text-align:center;"|
| 25 || 9 || 18 || 9 || 53 || 17 || 70 || 36 || 12 || 2.0 || 1.0 || 5.9 || 1.9 || 7.8 || 4.0 || 1.3
|-
! scope="row" style="text-align:center" | 2009
|style="text-align:center;"|
| 25 || 14 || 22 || 14 || 133 || 62 || 195 || 90 || 33 || 1.6 || 1.0 || 9.5 || 4.4 || 13.9 || 6.4 || 2.4
|- class="sortbottom"
! colspan=3| Career
! 270
! 471
! 309
! 3201
! 835
! 4036
! 1550
! 470
! 1.7
! 1.1
! 11.9
! 3.1
! 14.9
! 5.7
! 1.7
|}

Personal life 
On 4 January 2002, Lucas married Georgina Short. They have 3 daughters: Mia (born 12 December 2002), Hannah (born 12 July 2004), and Meg (born 26 May 2006).

References

External links 

Essendon Football Club players
Essendon Football Club Premiership players
Crichton Medal winners
1977 births
Living people
Australian rules footballers from Victoria (Australia)
Geelong Falcons players
Greenvale Football Club players
Victorian State of Origin players
One-time VFL/AFL Premiership players